American hip hop duo City Girls have released 2 studio albums, 1 mixtape and 31 singles (including 20 as a featured artist).

Albums

Studio albums

Mixtapes

Singles

As lead artist

As featured artist

Promotional singles

Other charted songs

Guest appearances

Notes

References

Hip hop discographies